Vidyashree Jayaram is an Indian television actress who predominantly works in the Kannada industry. She is well known for her role as Kavya in the Kannada soap opera, Kavyanjali.

Career

Vidhyasree began her career with Colors Kannada's dance reality show Thakadhimitha. 

She made her acting debut in 2019 with Star Suvarna's Varalakshmi Stores. She starred as Kavya in Udaya TV's Kavyanjali from 2020 to 2022.  Since March 2022, she is reprising her role of Kavya in Kavyanjali's Malayalam remake Manassinakkare. 

From July 2022, she is playing the lead role in Star Suvarna's Ardhangi.

Filmography

Television

Special appearances

References

External links
 

Living people

Year of birth missing (living people)
21st-century Indian actresses
Actresses in Kannada television
Actresses in Malayalam television
Indian television actresses